Mahesh Bhupathi and Leander Paes were the defending champions but did not compete that year.

Lucas Arnold and Mariano Hood won in the final 6–1, 6–7(7–9), 6–4 against Brian MacPhie and Nenad Zimonjić.

Seeds
Champion seeds are indicated in bold text while text in italics indicates the round in which those seeds were eliminated.

  Bob Bryan /  Mike Bryan (semifinals)
  František Čermák /  Leoš Friedl (first round)
  Gastón Etlis /  Martín Rodríguez (quarterfinals)
  Brian MacPhie /  Nenad Zimonjić (final)

Draw

External links
 Main draw

Doubles